San Sebastián Huehuetenango is a municipality in the Guatemalan department of Huehuetenango. It is located approximately 27 km. north of the city of Huehuetenango on Inter-American Highway heading toward the Mexican border at La Mesilla. The language spoken is Mayan Mam. The majority of the inhabitants are subsistence farmers.

Municipalities of the Huehuetenango Department